Reinhard Saftig (born 23 January 1952) is a German retired football player and manager.

Saftig has served as head coach of Bayern Munich, Borussia Dortmund, Hannover 96, VfL Bochum, and Bayer Leverkusen in the German Bundesliga.

Career
Saftig was born in Uersfeld. He began his head coaching career as the short-term manager of Bayern Munich, as a replacement for Pal Csernai. Saftig was in this role for 45 days only (17 May to 30 June 1983).

He then took over in Borussia Dortmund in the latter half of the 1985–86 season and secured Borussia's stay in the top flight in three intense relegation play-offs against 2. Bundesliga side Fortuna Köln. The following season was much stronger and resulted in Borussia Dortmund qualifying for the UEFA Cup after finishing 4th.

In 1991, Saftig arrived at the scene of a fatal highway accident involving Maurice Banach, a former player in the A-Youth squad of Borussia Dortmund, before the emergency services arrived. Banach had played for Saftig during his time with the youth squad.

During the 1992–93 season, Saftig led Bayer Leverkusen to the final of the German Cup. After his untimely firing by the club, Leverkusen would go on to clinch the Cup, defeating Hertha Berlin Amateurs in the final.

In 1994, he briefly took over the reins of Turkish club Kocaelispor before switching to Galatasaray.

From 22 June 2005 until 2008, Saftig served as general manager for Arminia Bielefeld. Prior to this position, he had worked as chief scout for Borussia Dortmund.

Coaching record

References

1952 births
Living people
People from Vulkaneifel
German footballers
German football managers
Hannover 96 managers
VfL Bochum managers
Galatasaray S.K. (football) managers
Bayer 04 Leverkusen managers
FC Bayern Munich managers
FC Bayern Munich non-playing staff
Süper Lig managers
Borussia Dortmund managers
Bundesliga managers
1. FSV Mainz 05 managers
Association football midfielders
Footballers from Rhineland-Palatinate
TuS Mayen players